Voice of Punjab (VOP) is an Indian Punjabi-language musical reality television show which is telecast on PTC Punjabi. Auditions for the show are held in major cities in Punjab, India such as Mohali, Jalandhar, Ludhiana and the holy city of Amritsar.

Seasons 1 
The winners of the first season of Voice of Punjab were Vinod Kumar and Paramjeet Kaur.

Season 2
Voice of Punjab Season 2 started in April 2011, across Punjab.  Pardeep Singh Sran from Bathinda and Jaspinder kaur from Chandigarh and were awarded as the winners. The anchor of the show was Sahil Vedoliyaa.

Season 3
Anantpal Singh from Ferozpur and Nimratpal Kaur from Gurdaspur won Voice of Punjab Season 3. They were awarded a car and a contract for a music album, to be launched by Vanjali Records. The anchor of the show was Sahil Vedoliyaa.

Season 4
VOP Season 4 brought back Sachin Ahuja, Master Saleem and Shazia Manzoor as judges to pick the best Punjabi singing talent from all over the world. The auditions were conducted not only across India but also in many cities of Canada and the United Kingdom. The hosts were Sahil and Gurjit Singh. This season was extremely anticipated as the expectation of talents were very high. Deepesh Rahi was conferred with the title of Voice of Punjab 2013. The winner was chosen from three singers selected from among the six finalists. Previously, PTC used to select two singers, one male and one female, but this was the first time that one singer would be conferred with the title of Voice of Punjab. the anchors of the show were Sahil Vedoliyaa and Gurjit Singh.

Season 5 
Neha Sharma of Kapurthala was declared as the winner of Season 5. Sadhu Singh from Batala was declared 1st runner-up while Simran Singh of Mukerian was declared 2nd runner-up. The anchor of the show was Gurjit Singh.

Season 6 
Sonali Dogra of Jammu won Voice of Punjab Season 6. She won a cash prize of Rs. one lakh and a car. The winner was decided after the six finalists performed live before a huge audience.

Season 7 
The winner of Voice of Punjab Season 7 was Amarjit Singh.

Season 8 
Voice of Punjab season 8 was hosted by Gurjit Singh and half by Sahil Vedoliyaa with Gurjit Singh. The judges this year were Sachin Ahuja, Roshan Prince, and Miss Pooja with guests as well. The winner of season 8 was Gurkirat Kaur.

Season 9 
Voice of Punjab season 9 was hosted by Gurjit Singh, VJ Rocky and Mukesh. The judges included Sachin Ahuja, Kamal Khan and Malkit Singh. Gaurav Kaundal was announced winner during the grand finale on 1 March 2019.

VOP Season 9 voting

Voting of Voice of Punjab Season 9 started from 22 February 2019.

Date, time and venue of the Grand Finale

Time - 6pm onwards

Date - 1 March 2019

Venue - 97 Acer Scheme, Parking Ground, Ranjit Avenue, Amritsar (Punjab, India)

Lakhwinder Wadali, Kaur B and Rajvir Jawanda performed in the Grand Finale.

Season 10 
Voice of Punjab Season 10 auditions started on 20 November in Amritsar. They ended on 28 November in Mohali. The judges were Sachin Ahuja, Kanth Kaler, and Miss Pooja, with guests as well.

Winners 
 Season 1 - Ricky Devgan
 Season 2 - Pardeep Sran
 Season 3 - Anantpal Billa and Nimratpal Kaur
 Season 4 - Mohit Sharma 
 Season 5 - Neha Sharma
 Season 6 - Sonali Dogra
 Season 7 - Amarjit Singh
 Season 8 - Gurkirat Kaur
 Season 9 - Gaurav Kaundal
Season 10 - Sunny Bal

References

External links 
Official website

Indian reality television series
PTC Punjabi original programming
2010 Indian television series debuts
Television shows set in Punjab, India
Indian music television series
Punjabi-language television shows
Song contests